Duchy of Belz or principality of Belz was a duchy, formed in the late 12th century in Kievan Rus. During its history the duchy was a constituent part of some other political entities such as the Kingdom of Rus, the Kingdom of Hungary, Duchy of Masovia when eventually in the late 14th century was incorporated into Poland becoming later the Bełz Voivodeship.

History
The duchy formed in 1170 because of the feudal fragmentation of Kievan Rus' when the Volhynia region (centered at Volodymyr) was passed to Mstislav II of Kiev who later split it between his sons. Mstislav was married to Agnes of Poland and in a fierce opposition to Yuri Dolgoruki. Being exiled to Poland for a short period of time Mstislav was able to drive the Suzdal's Prince out of Volhynia.

With time the city of Belz with its surrounded territories was passed to Vsevolod Mstislavich who in turn passed it to his son Alexander. In the early 13th century, Alexander, a nephew of Roman the Great, was deposed in 1234 from Belz by Daniel of Galicia who incorporated Belz into the Duchy of Galicia–Volhynia (later the Kingdom of Rus) which would control Belz till 1340. Soon afterwards, in 1240 and 1241, it was ravaged by the Mongols, as were most other Rus principalities; the town was burned, the local castle destroyed and locals had to recognize the Mongol suzerainty. The Mongol influence waned in the following decades, because of the decline of the Mongol Empire and Pax Mongolica.

Early in the 14th century, after the death of Boleslaw-Yuri II of Galicia, the King of Rus, there started a war for its succession. Eventually the Duchy was inherited by a prince Yuri, son of Narimantas (Jerzy Narymuntowicz) of the Grand Duchy of Lithuania. The period of Yuri's rule of Belz (1340-1377) saw the Galicia–Volhynia Wars; Belz was besieged several times (in 1351, 1352 and 1355). From 1378 to 1387 it fell into the sphere of influence of the Kingdom of Hungary, as in 1377 Belz was captured by Louis I of Hungary; for several years, the duchy was governed in Louis's name by prince Władysław Opolczyk. At that time, Poland was in a brief union with Hungary, but in 1387, after the end of the union, Belz was taken by Queen Jadwiga of Kingdom of Poland.

At first it was part of another Polish fiefdom, the Duchy of Masovia, as in 1388 the king of Poland, Władysław Jagiełło, granted Belz to Siemowit IV, Duke of Masovia, for his recognition of Masovia as a fiefdom of Poland and as a dowry for Siemowit's marriage with Jagiełło's sister, Alexandra. In 1462, after the death of Władysław II of Płock, the last of Siemowit's IV direct descendants, Casimir IV Jagiellon of Poland attempted to incorporate the entire Duchy of Masovia to Poland; eventually he succeeded only in incorporating the Duchy of Belz into the administrative structure of Poland as the Bełz Voivodeship (palatinate). Eventually, the Duchy of Masovia was incorporated in 1526. Belz remained part of Poland (later, the Polish–Lithuanian Commonwealth) till its partitions in the late 18th century.

Territory
The duchy's capital was in Belz.

Rulers
Vsevolod Mstislavich of Volhynia
Alexander Vsevolodovich (?-1234)
Vasylko Romanovich (1207–1211)
Alexander Vsevolodovich (?-1234)
Galicia–Volhynia
Daniel of Galicia (1234-?)
Lev Danylovich (1245–1264)
Yuri I of Galicia (1264–1301)
Andrew of Galicia (1301-1323)
Boleslaw-Yuri II of Galicia (1323-1340)
Lithuania
Yuri, son of Narimantas (1340-1377/1378)
Hungary
Władysław Opolczyk (for Louis I of Hungary) (1377/1378-1387)
Poland
Jadwiga of Poland/Władysław Jagiełło (1387-1388)
Masovia:
Siemowit IV, Duke of Masovia (1388-1426)
Kazimierz II of Belz (1426-1442, till 1434 with brothers (Władysław I of Płock, Siemowit V, Trojden II (d.1427)))
Władysław II of Płock (1455-1462)
Poland
Casimir IV Jagiellon

Notes

External links
  Princes of Belz
  Duchy of Belz in the Encyclopedia of History of Ukraine
  Lands and cities at litopys.org

1462 disestablishments
States and territories established in 1170
Duchies of Poland
Belz
Fiefdoms of Poland
Former duchies
Former principalities